The Illusive Man is a fictional character in BioWare's Mass Effect video game franchise. He is the leader of the pro-human group Cerberus. The Illusive Man wears an open suit that connotes both futuristic style and the "casual swagger of a charming billionaire". His eye implants make him appear slightly inhuman. He is normally seen in an empty office with no indication of his living arrangements. He is voiced by Martin Sheen.

The character first appeared in 2008's novel Ascension, and made his video game debut in Mass Effect 2 as a supporting character. In the game, he arranges to revive Commander Shepard from death, provides Shepard with a ship and crew, and sends Shepard on several missions against the human-abducting Collectors. The Illusive Man later appears in Mass Effect 3 as one of the main antagonists, where he works against Shepard's attempts to destroy the Reapers, wishing to control them instead. He appears in several other Mass Effect comics series and novels. Mass Effect: Evolution reveals the character's origin story as a mercenary named Jack Harper, who worked for the Human System Alliance during the First Contact War.

His critical reception has been positive, with Martin Sheen praised for his voice acting. However, some criticized Mass Effect 2s story for forcing the player to work with the Illusive Man and Cerberus despite their antagonistic role in the first game. Audio assets of the character from Mass Effect 2 was appropriated for use in a fan-made propaganda video which ostensibly endorses Donald Trump for his 2016 presidential campaign.

Concept and characteristics

The Illusive Man is the leader of Cerberus, a pro-human group officially regarded as a terrorist organisation by the Citadel Council and the humans' Systems Alliance. The character was voiced by Martin Sheen in both Mass Effect 2 and 3. According to Casey Hudson, Sheen really got into the role. Sheen has said he would suck on a pen to simulate smoking when recording lines, as he himself did not smoke.

At one point, the Illusive Man was planned as the boss fight for Mass Effect 3, having been altered by the Reapers. However, this was changed to avoid a clichéd ending. Additionally, BioWare felt it did not fit the Illusive Man—the Illusive Man's "weapon" being his intelligence, not physical strength—and wanted to let the player fight a character they recognised.

Design
His face was based on a catalog model, a decision made early in his development. He is largely symmetrical, and is meant to appear almost "perfect". He smokes, drinks, and is in his fifties but shows no signs of age due to in-universe medical improvements. His eye implants were designed to make him appear slightly inhuman. These implants are explained in Evolution as the result of interaction with a mysterious artifact that huskified those who directly touched it. For his indoctrinated appearance in Mass Effect 3, numerous facial concepts were drawn to determine just how much the character had been indoctrinated, with some referencing Saren Arterius (the main antagonist of the first Mass Effect game).

His suit was designed to both be recognizable as a suit and to combine "an impeccable futuristic style" and "the casual swagger of a charming billionaire". While the suit was designed with futuristic style in mind, it also had to not fit into any particular decade. It was decided that the Illusive Man's suit should be open, to give the impression he could do whatever he pleased.

The Illusive Man's main setting is his spacious and barren office. His personal quarters are never shown. The holographic computer terminals surrounding his office desk serve two functions: to show his connection to "a vast web of information" while decreasing his humanity for only communicating through holograms. He does not see actual people, but rather only facsimiles of them. His office view of a dying star reinforces his desire for full control of his environment. Only a small amount of concept art was made for the Illusive Man's room.

Personality and traits
The Illusive Man is described as believing "the end justifies the means", and was made to be morally gray. John Jackson Miller, who penned the script for Mass Effect: Evolution, Invasion, and Redemption, personally viewed him as a searcher that saw a "darker side to some of the great things humanity's discovered", the object of his search. During the course of the games, the writers did not want to reveal too much about him. His character development's "basic idea" was "one of these guys we don't know much about". BioWare considered his backstory and motivations, but could not elaborate in the games due to this narrative technique.

A "shadowy puppetmaster", he is also a smoker, a womaniser and a drinker, but is very charming. This helps him serve as a foil to the Commander. Adrien Cho, producer for Mass Effect 2, described him as being both the best and worst traits of humanity rolled into one person.

Appearances

In video games

Mass Effect 2
Mass Effect 2, a 2010 action role-playing video game, marked the Illusive Man's first in-game appearance. The player character and protagonist, Commander Shepard, is recalled to life by the Illusive Man's Cerberus after being killed by an unknown ship at the beginning of the game. The Illusive Man debriefs and tells Shepard about how the someone has been abducting human colonies and may be working with the Reapers, a sentient machine race dedicated to wiping out all organic life. To help Shepard launch an assault on the Reaper base, he provides the Commander with a ship, crew, and dossiers on potential squadmates. 

Over the course of the game, he sends Shepard to investigate Freedom's Progress, a recently abducted colony where Shepard discovers that the Collectors are behind the attack; Horizon, a colony in the process of being abducted; and a Collector ship, which turns out to be a trap—one that the Illusive Man knew about. At the end of the game, the Illusive Man sends Shepard to the Collector base, where the player decides whether to disable and turn over the base, or to destroy the base and cut all ties with Cerberus.

Mass Effect 3
The character returns in the sequel to Mass Effect, Mass Effect 3. He is first seen as a hologram on Mars when Shepard is retrieving data to stop the concurrent Reaper invasion of Earth. The Illusive Man tells Shepard his plan to control the Reapers and attempts to foil Shepard when Shepard resists. Over the course of the game, the Illusive Man commands Cerberus to attack the planet Sur'Kesh, homeworld of the salarians, to instigate a war between two allied races and to take control of the allied interspecies forces' base, the Citadel. He makes another appearance on the asari home planet, Thessia, where he again tries to convince Shepard that controlling the Reapers is the best solution. Shepard refuses and suggests that the Illusive Man is indoctrinated. In response, the Illusive Man commands the assassin Kai Leng to steal vital information necessary to combat the Reapers. Shepard tracks the VI to Cerberus's headquarters and discovers videos of the Illusive Man having himself implanted with Reaper technology and warning Kai Leng of Shepard.

At a control panel in the Citadel, the Illusive Man encounters Shepard as well as David Anderson, who is taken hostage and fatally shot by the Illusive Man. Depending on the player's prior in-game choices, Shepard may convince him that he is indoctrinated, which causes the Illusive Man to shoot himself, with his final words revealing that he attempted to resist the Reaper indoctrination. If Shepard shoots him instead; he remarks how beautiful Earth is while gazing out through the Citadel arms, wishing Shepard could see it the same way, before succumbing to his wounds.

In other media
Outside of the video games, the Illusive Man had earlier appeared in the 2008 Mass Effect: Ascension, the 2010 comic series Mass Effect: Redemption, and the 2010 novel Mass Effect: Retribution, wherein the Illusive Man becomes obsessed with indoctrination and decides to study it.

The 2011 Mass Effect: Evolution comic mini series reveals the Illusive Man's backstory as a mercenary named Jack Harper under the command of General Williams, the grandfather of Ashley Williams. The story opens during the First Contact War, the war between the alien turians and humanity upon the latter's discovery of extraterrestrial life and the mass relays. In one incident, Jack leads two other mercenaries, Ben Hislop and Eva Coré, in attacking a group of turians, and captures one as prisoner. The turian, named Desolas Arterius, lead them to an artifact that turns Ben into a zombie-like monster and leaves Jack with strange eyes and the mysterious ability to understand alien languages. After being captured and subsequently released by the Turians, Jack begins to search for clues about his mysterious visions of destruction. He and Eva were later captured by Desolas and his brother Saren who revealed to have custody of Ben. Jack and Eva are brought to a temple on the turian homeworld of Palaven where Desolas has excavated an artifact. Desolas reveals that he plans to use the artifact to create a new breed of turian soldiers. Jack realizes that the new turians would be feral and dangerous, but Desolas ignores his warning. Jack manages to convince Saren that converted turians are a threat just as they begin to turn on Desolas. In the end, Jack escapes as the turian military destroy the beacon and the converted turians. However, he loses both Ben and Eva and creates a manifesto for Cerberus in their name.

In Mass Effect: Deception, a 2012 novel, the Illusive Man is targeted by an extremist group, The Biotic Underground.

The Illusive Man is the main antagonist of Mass Effect: Invasion, a 2012 comic series.

The character appears in the fourth issue of the 2012 Mass Effect: Homeworlds, where he monitors Liara for her Prothean research on Reaper-defeating technologies. He sends a Phantom to kill her, which she defeats. He attempts to contact her afterwards. claiming the phantom to be a rogue agent, and proposes an alliance between the two. Liara is not convinced and cuts him off.

Reception
The Illusive Man was received well, and gained accolades for his appearance in Mass Effect 2. IGN called him the best PC character of 2010: "[a]n enigma, a crusader, an agent of calm in a vortex of chaos". In a vote for by Game Informer for their top 30 favorite characters of the 2000s decade, the Illusive Man placed 27th. Giant Bomb's 2010 Game of the Year listed the Illusive Man as the character with which they would most like to party. Game Informers Joe Juba listed the Illusive Man's appearance in Mass Effect: Retribution as a reason to read the book. Dan Ryckert, also writing for Game Informer, felt that Bruce Greenwood would best suit the character in the forthcoming Mass Effect film. When comparing Mass Effect to previous works that may have inspired the series, IGN's Christopher Monfette compared the character to the Smoking Man from The X-Files. GamesRadar praised his moral sense, putting Illusive Man in their 2018 list of the best villains in video game history (which supersedes their 2013 list) at number 23.

Martin Sheen was praised for his voice acting. Sheen was nominated for best male performance at the 2010 Spike Video Game Awards. Seth Schiesel from the New York Times singled out Sheen's performance as an example of BioWare's superbly evocative and believable voice acting and direction, alluding to the perceived similarities between the Illusive Man and Sheen's character Captain Benjamin L. Willard from the film Apocalypse Now as a "a wonderful, delicious riff". David Houghton, writing for GamesRadar, said Sheen's involvement is an instance of "[w]hen celebrity voice-acting goes very right". When reviewing Mass Effect 2, IGN's Erik Brudvig called Sheen's performance a "high point" in the game's cast. Similarly, Gameplanet's Aylon Herbet called him a "show-stealing personality".

Tom Francis of PC Gamer criticized how the player was forced to work with the Illusive Man and Cerberus in Mass Effect 2, saying that it was an interesting idea if an option, but "it's just frustrating" if the player was forced to do it. Nic Vargus, writing for GamesRadar, felt similarly and called it "one of the biggest narrative stretches in Mass Effect".

Cultural impact
In April 2016, a propaganda video promoted on various social media channels attracted media attention for its appropriation of audio assets from Mass Effect 2, which included the voice performance of the Illusive Man by Martin Sheen, in an ostensible show of support for the 2016 presidential campaign of Donald Trump. The original video, which was uploaded on YouTube and had stylistic similarities to a promotional trailer for Mass Effect 2, was liked and shared on Donald Trump's Twitter and Instagram accounts shortly before it was taken down due to copyright infringement claims by publisher EA, with an issued statement condemning the use of their intellectual property for political campaigns, though the video was still briefly visible on Trump's Twitter account before it was permanently removed. Former BioWare staff member Manveer Heir, who had worked on the video game series, expressed bemusement over the propaganda video and said that he "love[s] the idea that Trump may think he's the Illusive Man, who is verifiably the bad guy in the game." Sheen himself was a vocal critic of Trump throughout his tenure as US President.

References

External links

Cyborg characters in video games
Fictional archaeologists
Fictional criminals in video games
Fictional human rights activists
Fictional mercenaries in video games
Fictional secret agents and spies in video games
Fictional suicides
Fictional terrorists
Male characters in video games
Mass Effect characters
Video game antagonists
Video game characters introduced in 2008